The 2018 Winter Paralympics closing ceremony was held at Pyeongchang Olympic Stadium in Pyeongchang, South Korea, on March 18, 2018.

Ceremony

Opening
 Bandabi, the official mascot of the Games, opens the ceremony.
 South Korean band Kim Chang-wan Band performed "Arirang".

Parade of Nations
The flag bearers from each participating country entered the stadium informally in single file, ordered by ganada order of the Korean alphabet, and behind them marched all the athletes, without any distinction or grouping by nationality.

Performances
 Countertenor singer Lee Hee-sang and pianist Kim Ye-ji performed "You are a Flower".
 Bae Hui Gwan Band performed "존재감".
 South Korean singer Ailee performed her megahit "I Will Show You". 
 Bae Hui Gwan Band and Ailee also performed together the song "그대에게" by the late Shin Hae-chul.

Stephen Hawking tribute
The IPC President Andrew Parsons paid tribute to the late Stephen Hawking in his closing speech.

Handover of the Paralympic flag
The flag was passed by the mayor of Pyeongchang, Shim Jae-kook, to IPC President, Andrew Parsons, who then handed over to the mayor of Beijing, Chen Jining.

Beijing Performance

Dignitaries in Attendance

Anthems
 Sunny Kim - South Korean National Anthem
 Seoul Philharmonic Orchestra - Paralympic Hymn
 A choir of children's singers from the 56 ethnic groups of China - People's Republic of China National Anthem

References

Closing Ceremony
Ceremonies in South Korea
Paralympics closing ceremonies